Pseudotropheus demasoni is a species of cichlid endemic to Lake Malawi where it is only known from the Pombo Rocks in Tanzanian waters.  This species can potentially reach a maximum length of  SL.  It is now commonly found in the aquarium trade.

Named in honor of Laif DeMason (Homestead, Florida, USA), importer, exporter, and breeder of cichlids.

The color of both sexes is dark blue with black vertical stripes with alternating lighter stripes of light blue to white. Male Demasoni cichlids have egg-spots on the anal fin, while females may lack egg-spots. Males also grows to a larger maximum size than females. Stress coloration is similar to normal coloration but much paler. This species belongs to the so-called Mbuna group of haplochromine cichlids, and like most Mbuna it is highly territorial, with parental care for the offspring (maternal mouthbrooding).

References

demasoni
demosoni
Freshwater fish of Tanzania
Taxa named by Ad Konings
Fish described in 1994
Taxonomy articles created by Polbot
Taxobox binomials not recognized by IUCN